Kalyanam (season 2) is a 2017 Singaporean Tamil-language family soap opera starring Karthikeyan, Nithya Shree, Jayaram, Vishnu M. Anandh, Shamini and Balakumaran. It replaced Ithu Namma Veedu and it broadcast on MediaCorp Vasantham on Monday through Thursday from 3 July 2017 to 21 September 2017 at 10:00PM (SST) for 45 Episodes. It a second season of Kalyanam.

Synopsis
It is a story about is all about friendship, love & marriage. Radio DJ Anjali (Nithya Shree) encounters a different problem at work this time. Will this affect her marriage & how is her husband Arjun (Karthikeyan) going to help her?

Cast
Main Cast
 Karthikeyan as Arjun
a Anjali Husband
 Nithya Shree as Anjali
a Arjun Wife, She working Radio DJ 
 Jayaram
 Vishnu M. Anandh
 Shamini Gunasagar as  Anjali's colleague
 Balakumaran
 Kalai Vani
 Varman Chandra Mohan

Additional cast
 Kokila as  Anjali's mother
 Malene
 Suriavelan
 Harikrishnan
 Mahalakshmi
 Stephen
 Tasmaishree
 Jamuna Rani
 Manjula
 Karthik Logan
 Arockia Doss
 M. Karthigu

Original soundtrack

Soundtrack

Episodes

Broadcast
Series was released on 3 July 2017 on Mediacorp Vasantham. It aired in Malaysia on Mediacorp Vasantham, Its full length episodes and released its episodes on their app Toggle, a live TV feature was introduced on Toggle with English Subtitle.

References

External links 
 Vasantham Official Website
 Vasantham Facebook
 Kalayanam Season 2 Serial Episodes

2017 Tamil-language television seasons